WSJG-LP ("St. John Paul The Great Radio") is a non-commercial low-power FM broadcasting station at 103.3 MHz in Tiffin, Ohio. It is the seventh Catholic station in the Toledo Diocese and is named in honor of Pope John Paul II who is now a canonized saint.

History

The construction permit for WSJG-LP was granted by the FCC on February 12, 2014. Test transmissions began on January 1, 2015 and ended on January 27, 2015 when regular programming commenced.

WSJG airs Catholic programming from EWTN Global Catholic Radio for Tiffin and surrounding communities in Seneca County. Between signing on air and the completion of its local studio in May 2015, the station aired EWTN via an audio feed of Toledo-based Annunciation Radio (originated by WNOC). With the studio in operation, WSJG-LP also began producing local Catholic programming.

Callsign history
The WSJG call letters were previously used briefly in 1991 at a gospel music-formatted station at 104.3 FM in Hamlet, North Carolina which is now WJSG.

See also
 WNOC
 WJTA
 WLBJ-LP

External links
 Official WSJG website
 St John Paul The Great Radio on Facebook
 

SJG-LP
Seneca County, Ohio
Catholic radio stations
SJP-LP